The Internal Shuttle Bus is a network of bus routes that operate within the National University of Singapore Kent Ridge campus and between the Kent Ridge and Bukit Timah campuses.

The system is operated by ComfortDelGro and is entirely free of charge. Route information and live bus tracking is available with the NextBus app. The services are known for being extremely busy at peak times.

The buses used are Volvo B9Ls, Zhongtong N12s and BYD B12s.

History 
The NUS NextBus app was introduced in 2012.

A driverless bus, dubbed the NUSmart Shuttle, was introduced as a trial in 2019. It carried passengers until April 2020 when the service was suspended due to the COVID-19 pandemic. It continued operating without passengers until January 2021.

In 2020, in response to the COVID-19 pandemic, the routes were altered to allow students at Kent Ridge MRT station to reach different areas of campus without mixing with each other.

In July 2021, bus routes were changed. One major change was to services A1 and A2 which now terminate at Kent Ridge Bus Terminal instead of Prince George's Park residences. In November 2021, it was announced that the contract with ComfortDelGro Bus had been renewed and that the entire fleet would be replaced with electric buses. The first electric buses are expected to be introduced in the third quarter of 2022.

Routes 
There are several internal shuttle bus routes that run throughout NUS and link to both Kent Ridge MRT station and Botanic Gardens MRT station. There is also a bus route which links the Kent Ridge and Bukit Timah campuses and the Botanic Gardens MRT station.

References 

Bus transport in Singapore
National University of Singapore
University and college bus systems
Year of establishment missing